The 1991 Norwegian Football Cup was the 86th edition of the Norwegian Football Cup. The final took place at Ullevaal Stadion in Oslo on 20 October 1991. Strømsgodset were won the Norwegian Cup after they defeated Rosenborg with the score 3–2. This was Strømsgodset's fourth Norwegian Cup title.

Calendar
Below are the dates for each round as given by the official schedule:

First round

|colspan="3" style="background-color:#97DEFF"|29 May 1991

|-
|colspan="3" style="background-color:#97DEFF"|30 May 1991

|-
|colspan="3" style="background-color:#97DEFF"|2 June 1991

|-
|colspan="3" style="background-color:#97DEFF"|3 June 1991

|}

Second round

|colspan="3" style="background-color:#97DEFF"|11 June 1991

|-
|colspan="3" style="background-color:#97DEFF"|12 June 1991

|}

Third round

|colspan="3" style="background-color:#97DEFF"|25 June 1991

|-
|colspan="3" style="background-color:#97DEFF"|26 June 1991

|-
|colspan="3" style="background-color:#97DEFF"|27 June 1991

|}

Fourth round

|colspan="3" style="background-color:#97DEFF"|23 July 1991

|-
|colspan="3" style="background-color:#97DEFF"|24 July 1991

|-
|colspan="3" style="background-color:#97DEFF"|Replay: 6 August 1991

|}

Quarter-finals

|colspan="3" style="background-color:#97DEFF"|14 August 1991

|-
|colspan="3" style="background-color:#97DEFF"|Replay: 21 August 1991

|}

Semi-finals

Final

References
http://www.rsssf.no

Norwegian Football Cup seasons
Norway
Football Cup